The men's singles of the 2018 Advantage Cars Prague Open tournament was played on clay in Prague, Czech Republic.

Andrej Martin was the defending champion but chose not to defend his title.

Lukáš Rosol won the title after defeating Aleksandr Nedovyesov 4–6, 6–3, 6–4 in the final.

Seeds

Draw

Finals

Top half

Bottom half

References

External Links
Main Draw
Qualifying Draw

Advantage Cars Prague Open - Men's Singles
2018 Men's Singles